Bidasari may refer to:

 Bidasari (film), a 1965 Malaysian-Singaporean film
 Bidasari (play), a 1999 Filipino stage play
 Syair Bidasari, a 19th century (or earlier) Malay poem, which the 1965 film and 1999 play are based on

See also
 Bidasar (disambiguation)